Nicola Trentin (born 20 June 1974) is a former Italian long jumper.

Biography
He won the bronze medal at the 2001 Mediterranean Games. He also participated at the World Championships in 1999 and 2003, the World Indoor Championships in 2004 and the 2004 Olympic Games without reaching the final.

His personal best jump is 8.20 metres, achieved in July 2003 in Padova. The Italian record currently belongs to Andrew Howe with 8.47 metres. He has 21 caps in national team from 1996 to 2006.

Achievements

National titles
He has won 6 times the individual national championship.
3 wins in the long jump (2001, 2002, 2003)
3 wins in the long jump indoor (1998, 2003, 2004)

See also
 Italian all-time lists - Long jump

References

External links
 

1974 births
Living people
Italian male long jumpers
Athletics competitors of Fiamme Azzurre
Athletes (track and field) at the 2004 Summer Olympics
Olympic athletes of Italy
Mediterranean Games bronze medalists for Italy
Athletes (track and field) at the 2001 Mediterranean Games
World Athletics Championships athletes for Italy
Mediterranean Games medalists in athletics
People from the Province of South Sardinia
Sportspeople from Sardinia